T. K. Gopinatha Kurup (15 September 1945 in Thevalakkara, Kerala), also known by his pen name Babykuttan Thoolika, is an Indian drama director, producer, writer, poet, artist, and song writer.

Babykuttan began his career in the field of drama and theatre in the 1960s. As a writer, Babykuttan's works were known for their social relevance and thought-provoking themes. As a director, Babykuttan was known for his ability to bring out the best in his actors and for his innovative use of stage design and lighting,

Works 
Thoolika wrote and directed over 70 productions for 19 theatre troupes, composing the music in some cases.

 Pramani
 Pakal Pooram
 Chemmeen
 Layavinyasam
 Ammaveedu
 Thulasithara
 Mithunamrashi
 Palliveetta
 Kilipaate
 Swathanthran
 Kathilola Ponoola
 Anubhavangale Palichakale
 Enippadikal

Awards 

 2002 Kerala Sangeetha Nataka Academi Award (C. I. Parameswaran Pillai Memorial Endowment Award).
 2021 Gandhi Bhavan Art Award..

References 

Indian filmmakers
1945 births
Living people
People from Kollam district